Reenaas is a surname. Notable people with the surname include:

Kjersti Reenaas (born 1981), Norwegian ski-orienteering competitor
Marte Reenaas (born 1979), Norwegian ski-orienteering competitor 

Norwegian-language surnames